Jack Schumacher (10 July 1906 – October 1997) was a Swiss writer. His work was part of the literature event in the art competition at the 1936 Summer Olympics.

References

1906 births
1997 deaths
Swiss male writers
Olympic competitors in art competitions
Place of birth missing